Blastemanthus is a genus of flowering plants belonging to the family Ochnaceae.

Its native range is Southern Tropical America.

Species:

Blastemanthus gemmiflorus 
Blastemanthus grandiflorus

References

Ochnaceae
Malpighiales genera